Smith Peak may refer to:

 Smith Peak (Antarctica)
 Smith Peaks in Antarctica
 Smith Peak (British Columbia)  
 Smith Peak (Arizona)
 Smith Peak (Mariposa County, California)
 Smith Peak (Plumas County, California)
 Smith Peak (Trinity County, California)
 Smith Peak (Tuolumne County, California) in the Hetch Hetchy Valley
 Smith Peak (Idaho)
 Smith Peak (Nevada)  
 Smith Peak (Texas)
 Smith Peak (Vermont)

References